Celebrity Fit Club is a reality television series which followed eight overweight celebrities as they tried to lose weight. This show is based on the homonymous British version, which aired on the ITV Network from 2002 until 2006. The American version was executive produced by Richard Hall for Granada, in seasons 2–5.

Synopsis
The eight participants are split into two teams of four members apiece. During each week, the teams are given different physical challenges and their members are weighed to see if they have reached their target weights. Contestants are monitored and supervised by a team comprising a nutritionist, a psychologist, and a physical trainer. The series was hosted by Ant until Season 7.

At one point during each of the first five seasons, a team trade-off was initiated, in which the fit clubbers voted one member off their team. The teammate with the most votes was then traded to the other team. In the case of a tie, the team captain made the final vote. After Season 1, a new rule was enforced prohibiting participants from voting for themselves. In Season 5, to balance the gender-based teams, a new twist was added, which allowed traded fit clubbers to choose a teammate from their old team to join their new team. In Season 6, Harvey did the trade-off himself; Season 7 did not have one.

Panel members
 Ant, Host (Seasons 1–6)
 Harvey Walden IV, drill instructor (All seasons)
 Dr. David Katz, health expert (Season 1)
 Dr. Marisa Peer, psychologist (Season 1)
 Dr. Ian K. Smith, physician (Seasons 2–7)
 Dr. Linda Papadopoulos, psychologist (Seasons 2–4)
 Stacy Kaiser, psychotherapist (Seasons 5–6)
 Rhonda Britten, life coach (Season 7)

Seasons

Season 1 (2005)
Premiered 9 January 2005, and ran for 8 episodes.

Up until the end of the show Daniel was a model team leader; however, in episode 6, he turned up very late and confused, and by episode 8 (the finale), he did not appear at all, which cost his team victory. He later revealed that he had been abusing narcotics due to his back trouble and had entered rehab. No team captain was appointed to replace him.

Season 2 (2005)
Premiered 10 July 2005 for 8 Episodes

Season 3 (2006)
Premiered 1 January 2006 for 8 Episodes

NOTE: So far this is the only season where the team captains were not traded from their teams at the trade off.

Season 4 (2006)

Premiered 6 August 2006 for 8 Episodes

Season 5 (2007): Men vs. Women

The fifth season of Celebrity Fit Club premiered on 22 April 2007. Unlike previous seasons, the teams were grouped by sex until the team trade. The team trade took place on 13 May 2007. This season had 8 Episodes.

Statistics as of 10 June 2007.

Season 6 (2008): Boot Camp
The sixth season, titled Celebrity Fit Club: Boot Camp, premiered on 13 March 2008 for 8 episodes. The cast comprised both alumni of past seasons and newcomers. The alumni included:

Note: The Blue Team were known as the Newbies for the first 5 weigh-ins of the season.

Note: The Red Team were known as the Second Chancers for the first 5 weigh-ins of the season.

Production designer Roy Rede was hired to create the season's new design. A boot camp standing set complete with an obstacle course was built in the mountains outside of Los Angeles.

Season 7 (2010): Boot Camp 2

The seventh and final season, still titled Celebrity Fit Club: Boot Camp, premiered on 8 February 2010, with Harvey and Ian splitting the duties as host.

References

External links
 

2005 American television series debuts
2000s American reality television series
2010s American reality television series
2010 American television series endings
American television series based on British television series
Fitness reality television series
English-language television shows
Obesity in the United States
Television series by ITV Studios
VH1 original programming